Richard Weihe is a Swiss author who writes mainly in the German language. He was educated in Zurich and Oxford. He is mainly known for biographical works of artists, including the novel Meer de Tusche (2005) on the life of Bada Shanren and Der Milchozean (2010) based on Amrita Sher-Gil. Meer der Tusche won the Prix des Auditeurs de la Radio Suisse Romande and has been translated into English by Jamie Bulloch for Peirene Press.

References

Swiss male novelists
21st-century Swiss novelists
Living people
21st-century male writers
Year of birth missing (living people)